Halfmoon Bluff is a rock bluff overlooking the east side of Shackleton Glacier, rising immediately north of the mouth of Brunner Glacier, in the Cumulus Hills of Antarctica. It was so named by the Texas Tech Shackleton Glacier Expedition (1964–65) because its sheer cliffs and crescent shaped top give it the appearance of a half moon.

References

Cliffs of the Ross Dependency
Dufek Coast